Glenn McQuaid (born 1972/1973) is an Irish film director.  He is known for his feature film debut I Sell The Dead and his involvement in the audio play anthology series Tales From Beyond the Pale, both of which were produced by frequent collaborator Larry Fessenden's Glass Eye Pix.  He has also directed a segment of anthology horror film V/H/S.

Career 
McQuaid began his career at Glass Eye Pix, where he performed visual effects on films such as The Roost (2005) and The Last Winter (2006).  Inspired by the muted reception of one of his short films, he made his feature film debut, I Sell the Dead (2008), more comedic.  He cites David Cronenberg as an influence.  Rotten Tomatoes gives the film a 73% approval score based on 44 reviews.  After I Sell the Dead, he worked on the segment Tuesday the 17th in V/H/S, a 2012 horror anthology film.  The short was inspired by his enjoyment of early 1980s slasher films.  In 2014, he directed The Trouble with Dad, a segment in another horror anthology film, Chilling Visions: 5 States of Fear.

McQuaid collaborated with Fessenden again on the audio play anthology series Tales From Beyond the Pale, which he co-created.

Personal life 
McQuaid was born in Dublin, Ireland, and lives in New York City, New York, US.  He is openly gay.

Filmography 
 I Sell the Dead (2008)
 V/H/S (2012), segment Tuesday the 17th
 Chilling Visions: 5 States of Fear (2014), segment The Trouble with Dad

References

External links 
 

Living people
Irish film directors
Irish screenwriters
Horror film directors
Film people from Dublin (city)
Irish LGBT writers
LGBT film directors
Year of birth uncertain
Year of birth missing (living people)